The men's skeet shooting competition at the 1980 Summer Olympics was held on 24 July until 26 July at the Dynamo Shooting Range in Moscow, Russian SFSR, Soviet Union. Five shooters tied for first with 196, with the three medalists tying with a 25 possible in the shoot-off. Kjeld Rasmussen shot another possible 25 in the second shoot-off to win the gold medal over Lars-Göran Carlsson (silver) and Roberto Castrillo (bronze).

Result

Shoot-off

References

Sources

Shooting at the 1980 Summer Olympics